Stictoleptura variicornis is a species of longhorn beetle in the Lepturinae subfamily. It was described by Johan Wilhelm Dalman in 1817 and can be found in Poland, Russia, Ukraine, and the Baltic States. It can also be found in Asian countries like Mongolia and North Korea.

Description
The species is brown coloured with blackish-brown legs and antennae. The life span is 3 years, with a flight from June–August.

References

Stictoleptura
Beetles described in 1817
Beetles of Asia
Beetles of Europe